Cortinarius hesleri is an agaric fungus in the family Cortinariaceae. Officially described in 2013, it is found in eastern North America. It is named after American mycologist Lexemuel Ray Hesler.

See also
List of Cortinarius species

References

hesleri
Fungi of North America
Fungi described in 2013